On 20 January 2022, at least three people were killed and over 20 others injured by a bombing in Lahore, Punjab, Pakistan. At 1:40pm, a 1.5 kilogram improvised explosive device exploded on a motorcycle parked next to a pushcart outside a bank in a busy market chowk in the Anarkali area of the city. It broke windows of nearby buildings and set fire to several parked motorcycles. The spokesperson of the Baloch Nationalist Army, claimed responsibility for this attack and said that it targeted bank employees. The attack was strongly condemned locally in Pakistan and internationally by the United Arab Emirates, Iran, Turkey, the United States and Bahrain.  

Additionally the attack was also strongly condemned by leaders of Baloch terrorist groups including Mehran Marri and Brahumdagh Bugti. The condemnation by them highlighted the clash between the leaders of terrorist groups aboard and by the fighters on ground.

See also 

 Insurgency in Balochistan

References

2022 in Punjab, Pakistan
2020s building bombings
2022 bombing
2022 fires in Asia
2022 murders in Pakistan
Attacks on bank buildings
Attacks on buildings and structures in 2022
2022 bombing
Building bombings in Pakistan
Fires in Pakistan
Improvised explosive device bombings in 2022
2022
Insurgency in Balochistan
January 2022 crimes in Asia
Motorcycle bombings
2022 bombing
2022 bombing
Terrorist incidents in Pakistan in 2022
Vehicle fires in Asia
Terrorism in 2022